{{DISPLAYTITLE:C13H10O3}}
The molecular formula C13H10O3 (molar mass: 214.216 g/mol) may refer to:

 4,4'-Dihydroxybenzophenone
 Diphenyl carbonate
 Phenyl salicylate

Molecular formulas